Ximena Sariñana Rivera (born October 29, 1985) is a Mexican singer-songwriter and actress. In 2009, she received critical acclaim and a Grammy nomination for her debut album, Mediocre.

Early life
Ximena Sariñana was born in Guadalajara, Mexico to producer/director Fernando Sariñana and screenwriter Carolina Rivera and was raised in Mexico City. When she was two years old, Sariñana attended an Ella Fitzgerald concert, claiming this to be the beginning of her interest in music and one of her biggest influences. She soon started listening to other artists such as Paul Simon and Tracy Chapman. She would often be seen singing and dancing and dressed up in costumes as a child. When Sariñana was 7 years old, her neighbor, singer Cecilia Toussaint, suggested she should take singing lessons with her teacher, Ricardo Sánchez, who instructed some of Mexico's biggest talents. She also took up piano lessons with Hanna Cot. In 1994, Sariñana acted in the film Hasta morir (Til Death), which was produced by her father. Sariñana was educated at the Academia de Musica Fermatta, a performing arts school and Edron Academy, a private multi-lingual school, both located in Mexico City.

Career
1996–2010: Acting and debut album Mediocre

She began her acting career at 11 as the villain, "Mariela", in the popular Mexican telenovela Luz Clarita, starring Daniela Luján as the main character, Luz Clarita. The following year, Sariñana acted in the telenovela María Isabel as Rosa Isela, with Adela Noriega as the main character, María Isabel. Her final appearance in a telenovela was in the 1998 drama, Gotita de amor (Droplet of Love) as "Enriqueta". Other important movies in which she acted were as Ximena in the 2001 film El Segundo Aire (A Second Chance), Valentina in Niñas Mal (Bad Girls), and Mariana in the 2002 blockbuster film Amar Te Duele; all of which were directed by her father and written by her mother. She also appeared in a short film called De paso in 2005. In 2007, Ximena Sariñana acted in the movie Dos abrazos (Two Embraces) directed by Enrique Begne. Dos abrazos won Sariñana an award for Best Female Actress at the 38th Diosas de Plata of Pecime awards. She also acted in the movie Enemigos íntimos (Intimate Enemies), which was released on DVD in late 2008.

Sariñana showed an interest in music from an early age. At seventeen, after earning a scholarship for a five-week program at the Berklee College of Music, she composed three songs for the soundtrack of the Mexican movie Amar te duele; she also played the part of "Mariana" in the film.  Later, she performed as the lead vocalist in Feliz No Cumpleaños (Happy Un-Birthday), a Mexican funk-jazz, pop-rock band that she formed alongside old friends from the Academia de Musica Fermatta. She captivated audiences by singing "El Triste", originally performed by Mexican icon José José, during a televised performance.

Her first solo album Mediocre was released on February 12, 2008, by Warner Music Group. The album was recorded in Buenos Aires, Argentina and Uruguay. Ximena wrote most of the songs on the album and revealed in Venus Zine's Summer 2009 cover story that, "Learning the language of my nationality was something I really wanted to achieve... so I thought maybe if I did a Spanish album it would be a good challenge." On March 28, 2008, Mediocre was certified gold by AMPROFON for selling more than 50,000 copies. Sariñana would later receive further achievement when Mediocre reached platinum status in Mexico for selling more than 80,000 copies.

The music videos for "Vidas paralelas", "Normal", and "No Vuelvo Mas" were all shot in Iceland. "Vidas paralelas" was directed by Pablo Dávila. In late June, British electronic group, Metronomy, stated that they were fascinated with her debut album Mediocre and produced a remix of "La tina".  Her music video for the second single, "No Vuelvo Más", was premiered as an exclusive video on July 14, 2008, in MTV Mexico.

The album received critical praise in both Latin America and the United States.  It earned a rating of four and a half stars from Rolling Stone magazine in September 2008. The album was also nominated for a Grammy for "Best Latin Rock or Alternative Album" at the 51st Annual Grammy Awards in 2009. She was later nominated for two Latin Grammy awards for Best New Artist and Best Alternative Song but lost to Kany García and Volver a Comenzar by Café Tacuba respectively.

In 2007, she contributed vocals for the song "Valenciana" in the album Extempore by the Ensenada-based nujazz band Kobol. In March 2009, Sariñana was featured as a vocalist alongside her then-boyfriend Omar Rodríguez-López with his solo group on a European tour, which resulted in the live record Los Sueños de un Higado. She also provided vocals on Rodríguez-López's solo albums Xenophanes, Solar Gambling, Ciencia de los Inútiles, Cizaña de los Amores and Tychozorente.

She and Jason Mraz released a Spanish version of Mraz's song "Lucky". The video for the Spanish-version was released to MTV on June 22, 2009. In 2012, she recorded a duet for the song, "Oceanside" by musician Alex Wong for his first solo album, A City on a Lake.

2010–2012: Ximena Sariñana
In November 2009, Sariñana was in the studio working on her second album. Her second, self-titled, album consists of English songs written or co-written by her. The album contains one Spanish-language track, called "Tu y Yo". The album was recorded in Mexico City and Los Angeles during 2009 and was completed in early 2011. It was released in North America on August 2, 2011. The album's first single, "Different", was released in June 2011. Shine Down was released as a promotional single in summer 2011.

2013–present: No Todo lo Puedes Dar and "México tiene talento"
Her third studio album, "No Todo lo Puedes Dar", was recorded in Mexico City and Los Angeles in 2013. The album was released digitally worldwide on November 4, 2014. 

 The album's lead single is called "Sin Ti No Puede Estar Mal". The official lyric video was directed by her brother Sebastian and filmed in Mexico City in August. It was released on her YouTube account on September 18, 2014. The music video for the single premiered on Sariñana's YouTube account on October 1, 2014.

Sariñana also returned to acting, appearing in the short film, Gonzalo, alongside Alfonso Herrera in May 2014. In September 2014, she was revealed as one of the judges for the reality talent show competition, México tiene talento, the Mexican franchise of Got Talent. The program airs weeknights on TV Azteca in Mexico beginning on October 20, 2014.

In 2011, she recorded vocals for the song "Those Were The Days" by the English band McFly while they were on a trip to America to write and record songs for their 6th studio album in a duet with lead singer Tom Fletcher, as well as shot a music video for the song. The songs recorded in that time were shelved, but were eventually brought back out for The Lost Songs. Her song with them was officially released on October 27, 2019, for the album.

On April 16, 2020, she participated in a charity single for the people of Mexico, titled "Resistiré México".

Personal life
Sariñana dated musician and producer Omar Rodríguez-López for several years before the pair split up in 2011. Her brother, Sebastian, is a director and toured alongside her as a musician in her band. 

In 2016, she married Rodrigo Rodríguez. They have two daughters. Sariñana is fluent in Spanish and English and is based in both Mexico City and Los Angeles, California.

Discography

Singles
{| class="wikitable plainrowheaders" style="text-align:center;"
|-
! rowspan="1" scope="col" style="width:15em;" | Title
! rowspan="1" scope="col" style="width:2em;" | Year
! rowspan="1" scope="col" style="width:10em;" | Album
|-
! scope="row"|"Vidas Paralelas"
| rowspan="2" style="text-align:center;" |2008
| rowspan="3" style="text-align:center;" |Mediocre|-
! scope="row"|"No vuelvo más"
|-
! scope="row"|"Mediocre"
| rowspan="1" style="text-align:center;" |2009
|-
! scope="row"|"Different"
| rowspan="2" style="text-align:center;" |2011
| rowspan="2" style="text-align:center;" |Ximena Sariñana|-
! scope="row"|"Echo Park"
|-
! scope="row"|"Aire Soy feat. Miguel Bosé"
| rowspan="1" style="text-align:center;" |2011
| rowspan="1" style="text-align:center;" |Miguel Bosé- Papitwo|-
! scope="row"|"Sin ti no puede estar tan mal"
| rowspan="1" style="text-align:center;" |2014
| rowspan="2" style="text-align:center;" |No todo lo puedes dar
|-
! scope="row"|"Ruptura"
| rowspan="1" style="text-align:center;" |2015
|-
! scope="row"|"¿Qué Tiene?"
| rowspan="2" style="text-align:center;" |2018
| rowspan="4" style="text-align:center;" |¿Dónde Bailarán Las Niñas?
|-
! scope="row"|"Si Tú Te Vas"
|-
! scope="row"|"Lo Bailado"
| rowspan="2" style="text-align:center;" |2019
|-
! scope="row"|"Cobarde"
|}

As featured artist

Guest appearances
 Extempore by Kobol (2007)
Los Sueños de un Higado by Omar Rodríguez-López Group (2009)
 Xenophanes by Omar Rodríguez-López (2009)
 Solar Gambling by Omar Rodríguez-López (2009)
 "Fue Por Ti" by Audifunk (2010)
 Ciencia de los Inútiles by El Trío de Omar Rodríguez-López (2010)
 Tychozorente by Omar Rodríguez-López (2010)
 Cizaña de los Amores by Omar Rodríguez-López (2010)
 Dōitashimashite by Omar Rodríguez-López Group (2010)
 "Those Were The Days" by McFly (2019)

Filmography

Television appearances

References

External links

Official website

1985 births
Living people
Mexican women singer-songwriters
Mexican singer-songwriters
English-language singers from Mexico
Rock en Español musicians
Mexican film actresses
Mexican telenovela actresses
Actresses from Guadalajara, Jalisco
Singers from Guadalajara, Jalisco
Warner Music Latina artists
Latin music songwriters
21st-century Mexican singers
21st-century Mexican women singers
20th-century Mexican actresses
21st-century Mexican actresses
Women in Latin music